Conrad Homan (February 27, 1840 – January 30, 1922) was a volunteer soldier in the Union Army during the American Civil War.  Homan served with the 29th Regiment Massachusetts Volunteer Infantry and, for his actions during the Battle of the Crater on July 30, 1864 he received the Medal of Honor.

Medal of Honor citation
Rank and organization: Color Sergeant, Company A, 29th Massachusetts Infantry.
Place and date: Near Petersburg, Va., July 30, 1864.
Entered service at:------.
Birth: Roxbury, Mass.
Date of issue: 3 June 1869.
Citation:

Fought his way through the enemy's lines with the regimental colors, the rest of the color guard being killed or captured.

See also

List of Medal of Honor recipients
List of American Civil War Medal of Honor recipients: G–L
Massachusetts in the American Civil War

References

External links

1840 births
1922 deaths
United States Army Medal of Honor recipients
Union Army soldiers
American Civil War recipients of the Medal of Honor